The Rivers School is an independent, coeducational preparatory school in Weston, Massachusetts.

Rivers' Middle School program includes grades 6-8, while its Upper School program includes grades 9-12. As of 2014, 489 students are enrolled from 70 Massachusetts towns. The Rivers School's endowment was $22.3 million for the 2014-15 academic year.

History
The school was founded in 1915 as a school for boys at its first location in Brookline, Massachusetts. The founder and first headmaster was Robert W. Rivers. The Country Day School for Boys of Boston merged with Rivers in 1940. The school moved to its present location in Weston in 1960. It became co-educational in 1989.

Academics

Rivers offers the following Advanced Placement classes:
 English literature and composition
 United States History
 United States Government & Politics
 Modern European History
 Latin
 French Language & Culture
 Spanish
 Statistics
 Calculus AB and BC
 Microeconomics
 Environmental Science
 Chemistry
 Biology
 Physics
 Computer Science
 Music Theory
 Chinese

Athletics

Rivers competes in the Independent School League. Robert I. Pipe, Jr. has served as Director of Athletics since July 2017.

Indoor athletic facilities include the Haffenreffer Gymnasium with a full-size basketball court and the 78,000- square foot MacDowell Athletic Center which contains:
 MacDowell Ice Arena hockey rink, which during the fall, spring and summer transforms into a 70 x 40 yard indoor synthetic field
 Benson Gymnasium
 Benson Fitness Center
 Sports medicine office
 Team rooms
 Locker rooms

Rivers has boys and girls varsity teams in the following sports:
 Football (boys only)
 Field Hockey (girls only)
 Soccer
 Cross Country
 Basketball
 Ice Hockey
 Alpine Skiing
 Nordic Skiing
 Lacrosse
 Baseball (boys only)
 Softball (girls only)
 Tennis
 Track
 Volleyball (girls only)

The Rivers School Conservatory

The Rivers School Conservatory was founded in 1975 by Ethel Bernard, one of the pioneers of the music school movement. She approached the Rivers School with the idea of using the then-unoccupied former headmaster's house on the campus (now called Blackwell House after George H. Blackwell) of the then-all-boys college preparatory school.

It was first called the Music School at Rivers, then Rivers School Conservatory. In 1978, the Annual Seminar on Contemporary Music for the Young was established. It was the subject of a WGBH-TV documentary that was broadcast internationally by PBS. Seminar guests have included John Cage (1983). All pieces performed are composed in the 25-years prior to each seminar. Many were premières and several dozen were commissioned pieces. Recent examples include Matineé: The Fantom of the Fair by Libby Larsen.

The Conservatory presently has over 750 students, including a student orchestra program, jazz and chamber ensembles, music theory and composition, its critically acclaimed Marimba Magic program, choruses, master classes, workshops, and private lessons on every orchestral and jazz instrument, piano, and voice.

Notable alumni include Matthew Aucoin, whose teacher was Sharon Schoffmann.

The Boston Globe has reviewed some of its concerts.

Clubs and cocurriculars
 The robotics team Architects competed in the FIRST Tech Challenge, under the team number 4176.
 The Debate and Model UN clubs attend national conferences every year, including the University of Connecticut's Model UN Conference and the New England Region of Junior Statesmen of America debates.
 The Current, the school's art and literary magazine, was awarded First Place in the 2013 American Scholastic Press Association's national competition.

Notable alumni
 Jack Lemmon ’39, actor
 John T. Noonan, Jr. '44, United States Court of Appeals for the Ninth Circuit senior judge
 David Steinberg '46, Distinguished Professor of Asian Studies at Georgetown University School of Foreign Service
 Frederick Wiseman '47, documentary filmmaker
 David Lamb '51, reporter for major newspapers including The Milwaukee Journal and The Los Angeles Times
 Glen W. Bowersock ’53, ancient history scholar at the Institute for Advanced Study in Princeton.
 Richard G. Darman ’60, former director of the Office of Management and Budget (1989–1993)
 David Sutherland '63, award-winning independent documentary filmmaker
 Joseph I. Banner ’71, former CEO  of the Cleveland Browns and longtime front office executive in the Philadelphia Eagles organization
 Philip Goldberg '74, The US Assistant Secretary of State for Intelligence and Research
 Joshua Kraft '85, CEO of the Boys and Girls Clubs of Boston and President of the New England Patriots Charitable Foundation
 Jon Anik '97, commentator and television host for the Ultimate Fighting Championship
 Stephen Belichick, Outside Linebackers Coach for the New England Patriots
 Jillian Dempsey ’09, professional ice hockey player
 Charlie Rugg '09, Professional Soccer Player for the Los Angeles Galaxy
 Elliot Richardson, lawyer and member of Nixon and Ford cabinets

References

External links
 
 Rivers School on Instagram. Archived from the original on ghostarchive.org
  

Independent School League
Schools in Middlesex County, Massachusetts
Private middle schools in Massachusetts
Private high schools in Massachusetts
Weston, Massachusetts
1915 establishments in Massachusetts
Educational institutions established in 1915